Cu Bretan mac Conghusa, Irish poet, fl. 721.

Cu Bretan was one of two poets who wrote verse commemorating the Battle of Almhain.

At-aghur cath forderg flann,
a fir Fergaile, a deghlínd.
bronach muinter Muire de
iar m-breth a taige dia cínd.
Bó in chlaim
ro gáet inarradh in daim.
mairg laim ro gheoghain a brath
re techt a cath co mac m-Brain.
Ma beth neach do-bera cath
matain derbmain fri mac m-Brain,
andsa lium inas in drai
in cai ro chechtair in chlaim.

See also

 Nuadha hua Lomthuile
 Áed Allán

External links
 http://www.ucc.ie/celt/published/G100002/index.html

Medieval Irish poets
8th-century Irish people
8th-century Irish poets
Irish male poets
Irish-language writers